Aminder Dhaliwal (born December 5, 1988) is a Canadian animator, storyboard artist, cartoonist, writer, and director. She is best known for her 2018 graphic novel Woman World.

Dhaliwal was born to Punjabi parents in Wembley, England where she grew up until the age of 11. Her family then moved to Brampton, Ontario where she spent the rest of her adolescence. She attended Sheridan College for animation and, in her final year, won a placement at Nickelodeon as a production intern in 2011. She moved to Los Angeles and began working as a storyboard revisionist, and since 2012 has accumulated credits as a writer, director, storyboard artist and storyboard director on a number of television series, including The Fairly OddParents, Sanjay and Craig, Steven Universe, and Pinky Malinky. She is currently employed as a storyboard director at Cartoon Network, director at Disney Television Animation, and story artist at Sony Pictures Animation.

Comics

Inspired by the Women's March in 2017, Dhaliwal began serializing Woman World on Instagram. The science fiction comic tells the story of the development of an all-woman civilization after men become extinct as a result of a birth defect. After amassing over 100,000 followers on Instagram, the strip was reworked for print and collected as a graphic novel published by Drawn & Quarterly in September, 2018.

The Instagram version of Woman World was nominated for a 2018 Ignatz Award for Outstanding Online Comic. In 2019, the graphic novel was itself nominated for a Doug Wright Spotlight Award and made the longlist of nominees for the Stephen Leacock Memorial Medal for Humour.

On March 27, 2019, it was announced that Dhaliwal was writing the pilot episode of an animated version of Woman World for Disney's Freeform cable network. Actress Felicia Day is to produce the proposed series.

Animation

References

External links 
 Instagram

Living people
1988 births
Canadian cartoonists
Canadian comics writers
Canadian comics artists
Alternative cartoonists
Canadian humorists
Canadian webcomic creators
Canadian emigrants to the United States
Canadian female comics artists
Canadian women novelists
Women humorists
Canadian women animators
Female comics writers
Canadian storyboard artists
Canadian graphic novelists
Canadian animated film directors
Canadian television directors
Disney people
21st-century Canadian novelists
21st-century Canadian women writers
Canadian women television directors